Crescent Island may refer to:

 Crescent Island, Bay of Isles, South Georgia
 Crescent Island (Nunavut), Canada
 Crescent Island, Lake Naivasha, Kenya

See also
 Ngo Mei Chau  (娥眉洲, Crescent Island), in Hong Kong